Some Kind of Monster may refer to:

 "Some Kind of Monster" (song), a song by Metallica
 Some Kind of Monster (EP), an EP by Metallica
 Metallica: Some Kind of Monster, a documentary film titled after the song